In the Headlines is a 1929 crime drama film directed by John G. Adolfi and starring Grant Withers and Marian Nixon. It was produced and distributed by the Warner Brothers.

Cast
Grant Withers - Nosey Norton
Marion Nixon - Anna Lou Anderson
Clyde Cook - Flashlight
Edmund Breese - Eddy
Pauline Garon - Blondie 
Frank Campeau - Detective Robinson
Vivian Oakland - Mrs. Kernell 
Hallam Cooley - Fancy Somerset
Robert Ober - Parker
Ben Hall - Cub Reporter
Spec O'Donnell - Johnny
Jack Wise - Levine

Preservation status
This film is considered to be lost.

References

External links
 In the Headlines at IMDb.com

1929 films
1929 crime drama films
American crime drama films
Films about journalists
Films directed by John G. Adolfi
Lost American films
Warner Bros. films
1929 lost films
1920s American films